Miś Uszatek (Floppy Bear, literally Teddy Floppy-ear) is a Polish character from the stop motion-animated TV series of the same name. He was created jointly by Polish writer Czesław Janczarski and cartoonist Zbigniew Rychlicki.

Miś Uszatek's first appearance was in a Polish comic magazine for children, "Miś", on 6 March 1957. Later, he was the main character of several children's books, which were translated into many languages. However, Miś Uszatek became very popular in 1975, when Łódź Animated Forms Studio (Studio Malych Form Filmowych), Se-ma-for, created a series of cartoons for the Polish TV network, featuring actor Mieczysław Czechowicz, who voiced the characters. In all-time Polish rankings of animated programs, the show usually comes second only to Bolek i Lolek.

The teddy bear Miś Uszatek and his friends - Prosiaczek (Piglet), Króliczki (Little Rabbits) and Zajączek (Little Hare), as well as Kruczek the Puppy - were loved by preteen kids. At the same time, Uszatek played the role of a friend from kindergarten. He was also liked by parents, as he would always go to bed at appropriate hour, singing the goodnight song:

All together, Se-ma-for created 104 episodes of the cartoon; the last one was made in 1987. In the 1960s, two theatrical movies about the friendly bear were made.
Also, in the fall of 2007, the Se-ma-for studio announced that it was planning to make more episodes, but later these plans changed in favor of a possible full-length movie, to be created with help from the Japanese company Eden Entertainment. As of 2008, Mis Uszatek airs on Polish TV every Thursday.

In July 2007, local authorities in Łódź decided to construct a monument dedicated to Miś Uszatek, to be placed along Łódź's main street, Piotrkowska.

Miś Uszatek abroad
The cartoon is also popular in other countries; it is one of the best-selling exports of Polish television. All together, Polish TV have sold it to 22 countries, including Canada, Iran, and a number of African nations.

 In Belarus (post-USSR) as Аблавушак
 In Catalonia (Spain) as Les històries de l'osset Faluc
 In Czech as Medvicek Usacek and aired on ČT1 (later ČT2), and Decko as part of Vecernicek.
 In Finland it is known as Nalle Luppakorva and it was so popular there that dolls featuring the series' characters were once stolen from an exhibition.
 In Hungary as Füles Mackó and aired on MTVA as part of TV Maci.
 In Israel as הרפתקאותיו של דובון
 In Japan as Oyasumi Kuma-chan (おやすみ、クマちゃん, Good night, little bear).
 In the Netherlands as Teddy Hangoor
 In North Macedonia as Мечето Ушко (Mecheto Ushko)
 In Portugal as O urso Teddy
 In Russia (post-USSR) as Мишка-Ушастик
 In Slovakia as Macko Uško
 In Slovenia as Medvedek Uhec
 In the United Kingdom as Teddy Drop Ear with voices by Jeni Barnett as part of the TV-am children's magazine programme Rub-a-Dub-Tub.

In June 2010, Mennica Polska S.A. minted 8,000 silver 1-dollar coins depicting Miś Uszatek on behalf of the government of Niue.

Footage from this cartoon series was also shown on Tots TV as animated illustrations for some of Tom's stories which he makes up and writes himself.

References

External links

Virtual museum of Polish cartoons, with photos of Uszatek and his friends 
MIŚ USZATEK on nostalgia.pl 
Misuszatek.pl 
Mis Uszatek's official Japanese page 
O Ursinho Teddy 

Fictional teddy bears
1970s Polish television series
1980s Polish television series
1975 Polish television series debuts
1987 Polish television series endings
Polish children's animated television series
Telewizja Polska original programming